Avesnes-le-Comte is a commune in the Pas-de-Calais department in northern France.

Geography
A small farming town located 11 miles (17 km) west of Arras at the junction of the D8, D75 and D339 roads.

Population

Sights
 The motte of a 12th-century castle.
 The church of St. Nicholas, with the apse dating from the twelfth century.
 The town hall, built in 1830.
 An ancient cemetery.
 The war memorial.

See also
Communes of the Pas-de-Calais department

References

Communes of Pas-de-Calais